Vice Admiral Ahmadi Heri Purwono (born 28 October 1965) is a vice admiral in the Indonesian Navy who served as a Senior Officer (Indonesian: Perwira Tinggi) to the Deputy Chief of Naval Staff. The last position of this three-star general was Commander of the Fleet Command I.

Career
He graduated from the AAL-33 TA Naval Academy in 1988. He has served various assignments both on warships and on staff.

His education and training later included Suspaja TA (1988), Dikspespa/Art Angk-7 TA (1992/1993), Diklapa-II/Koum Angk-11 TA (1997/1998), Seskoal Angk-39 TA 2001, Dikreg Sesko TNI Angk-38 TA (2011) and Lemhannas RI PPRA Angk-52 TA (2014).

On 11 June 2021, he was selected as a candidate to replace Admiral Yudo Margono.

Awards

 Bintang Yudha Dharma Nararya

 Bintang Dharma

 Satyalancana Seroja

 Bintang Jalasena Nararya

 Satyalancana Kesetiaan 24 years' service

 Satyalancana Kesetiaan 16 years' service

 Satyalancana Kesetiaan 8 years' service

 Satyalancana Dwidya Sistha

 Satyalancana Kebhaktian Sosial

 Satyalancana Dharma Nusa

 Satyalancana Wira Dharma

 Satyalancana Ksatria Yudha

Position 
 Palaksa KRI Yos Sudarso (1990)
Dandiv-B Korsis AAL
Palaksa KRI Ajak
Commander of KRI Soputan
Commander of KRI Sura
Commander of KRI Singa
Commander of KRI Badik
Pabanrem SOPS Armatim
Balikpapan Lanal Commander
Dirminlakgar Ditjenrehan Ministry of Defense RI
Danlantamal VIII/Manado (2017–2018)
Kaskoarmada II (2018–2019)
Pankolinlamil (2019–2020)
Commander I (2020)
Wakasal (2020–Present)

See also
Indonesian military ranks

References

1965 births
Living people
Indonesian admirals
People from Semarang
Chiefs of Staff of the Indonesian Navy